Richard Dreyfuss is an American actor. He is best known for starring in popular films between the 1970s and 1990s, including American Graffiti, Jaws, Stand by Me, Close Encounters of the Third Kind, Down and Out in Beverly Hills, The Goodbye Girl, Tin Men, Stakeout, Always, What About Bob?, and Mr. Holland's Opus.

Film

Television

Stage

References

External links
Richard Dreyfuss at the Rotten Tomatoes

Male actor filmographies
American filmographies